Associació Esportiva Sedís Bàsquet, a.k.a. Cadí La Seu for sponsorship reasons, is a basketball team of La Seu d'Urgell, Spain. The women's team currently plays in Liga Femenina while the men's one plays in Regional divisions after resigning to its berth in Liga EBA in summer 2012.

Women's team

Current roster

Season by season

References

External links
Official website
Club's page at Federación Española de Baloncesto

Women's basketball teams in Spain
Catalan basketball teams
Liga Femenina de Baloncesto teams
Basketball teams established in 1965
La Seu d'Urgell